The Texas and Pacific Railway Company (known as the T&P) was created by federal charter in 1871 with the purpose of building a southern transcontinental railroad between Marshall, Texas, and San Diego, California.

History

Under the influence of General Buell, the T&P was originally to be  gauge, but this was overturned when the state legislature passed a law requiring  gauge.

The T&P had a significant foothold in Texas by the mid-1870s. Construction difficulties delayed westward progress, until American financier Jay Gould acquired an interest in the railroad in 1879.  The T&P never reached San Diego; instead it met the Southern Pacific at Sierra Blanca, Texas, in 1881.

The Missouri Pacific Railroad, also controlled by Gould, leased the T&P from 1881 to 1885 and continued a cooperative relationship with the T&P after the lease ended.  Missouri Pacific gained majority ownership of the Texas and Pacific Railway's stock in 1928, but allowed it to continue operation as a separate entity until they were eventually merged on October 15, 1976. On January 8, 1980, the Missouri Pacific Railroad was purchased by the Union Pacific Railroad. Because of lawsuits filed by competing railroads, the merger was not approved until September 13, 1982. Due to outstanding bonds of the Missouri Pacific, though, the actual merger with the Union Pacific Railroad took place on January 1, 1997.

Several parts of the Texas and Pacific remain to this day, mainly two towering buildings, which help define the southern side of Fort Worth's skyline—the original station and office tower and a warehouse located immediately to the west. In 2001, the passenger platforms at the T&P station were put into use for the first time in decades as the westernmost terminus for the Trinity Railway Express, a commuter rail line connecting Fort Worth and Dallas. The T&P Warehouse still exists, but remains vacant with no plans to renovate it despite significant civic support and third-party developer interest. The passenger terminal and corporate offices have been converted into luxury condominiums.

Major named passenger trains of the Texas and Pacific
Major named passenger trains of the Texas and Pacific (route sections between St. Louis and Texarkana were operated by Missouri Pacific):
Louisiana Eagle — New Orleans–Dallas–Fort Worth
Southerner - St. Louis (north branch), Memphis, Tennessee (northeast branch), Alexandria, Louisiana (south branch) - El Paso
Sunshine Special - St. Louis - El Paso and Laredo, Texas
Texan - St. Louis - San Antonio and Houston
Texas Eagle — St. Louis–various Texas points - western section going to El Paso, with connecting Southern Pacific service to Los Angeles; southwestern section to Laredo, with car change for Mexico City; southern section going to Houston
Westerner — St. Louis–Dallas–El Paso—connection in El Paso for Southern Pacific service to Los Angeles

Timeline

March 3, 1871 - United States Congress grants a charter to the Texas Pacific Railroad Company
1871 - Texas legislature charters the company and grant permission to purchase the Southern Trans-Continental Railway Company and the Southern Pacific Railroad Company. Note: This is a different Southern Pacific Railroad company from the one referred to above.
March 21, 1872 - The Southern Pacific is purchased.
March 30 - Southern Trans-Continental Railway Company is purchased.
1872 - Thomas A. Scott, president of the Pennsylvania Railroad, becomes president of the Texas & Pacific.
May 2, 1872 - an Act of Congress changes the name to  Texas and Pacific Railway Company
June 12, 1873 - Memphis, El Paso and Pacific Railroad Company purchased.
July 1, 1873 - First rail line opened between Longview, Texas, and Dallas, Texas
December 28, 1873 - Rail line from Marshall, Texas, to Texarkana, Texas, placed in service.
 1881 - Abilene, TX connected to the line.
1888 - Flooding in Louisiana due to the 1886/1887 hurricane season and crop failures in Texas due to drought caused T&P to go into bankruptcy.  The bonds that were sold to pay for the construction of the rail lines could not be paid, so the court converted the land into an asset of a separate company, the Texas Pacific Land Trust.
1925 - Lima Locomotive Works delivers 2-10-4 locomotives to the T&P. The type is nicknamed "Texas" as a result.
October 15, 1976 - merged with the Missouri Pacific

"T&P" includes its subsidiary roads (A&S, D&PS, T-NM etc.); operated route-miles totalled 2259 at the end of 1929 (after C&NE, PVS and TSL had become subsidiaries) and 2033 at the end of 1960.

Legal disputes 
The Texas and Pacific was unable to finance construction to San Diego, and as a result the Southern Pacific was able to build from California to Sierra Blanca, Texas. In doing so, Southern Pacific used land designated for, and surveyed by Texas and Pacific, in its rail line from Yuma, Arizona, to El Paso, Texas. This resulted in lawsuits, which were settled with agreements to share tracks, and to cooperate in the building of new tracks. Most of the features advantageous to Texas and Pacific were later disallowed by legislation.

Land grants 

From 1873 to 1881 the Texas and Pacific built a total of 972 miles (1,560 km) of track; as a result it was entitled to land grants totalling 12,441,600 acres (50,349 km2).  T&P, however, received land only for the construction of track east of Fort Worth.  This meant the firm received only 5,173,120 acres (20,935 km2).  The State of Texas did not award the additional area because, it said, the construction had not been completed within the time required by the firm's charter.  The then state Attorney General Charles A. Culberson filed suit to recover 301,893 acres (1,222 km2) on the grounds that "the road had been granted land partly on sidetracks and partly on land not subject to location."  The state ultimately recovered 256,046 acres (1,036 km2) giving a net grant to the T&P of 4,917,074 acres (19,899 km2), or 7,683 square miles.  By comparison, the state of Connecticut is 5,543 square miles (14,356 km2).

Surviving Steam Locomotives

Texas Pacific Land Trust
The Texas Pacific Land Trust (NYSE: TPL) was created in 1888 in the wake of the bankruptcy of the T&P in order to provide an efficient and orderly way to sell the railway's land, receiving at the time in excess of 3.5 million acres (14,000 km2).  As of 31 December 2006 the Trust was still the largest private land owner in the state of Texas, owning the surface estate of 966,392 acres (3,911 km2) spread across 20 counties in the western part of the state.  The Trust also generates income from oil & gas royalties through its 1/128 non-participating royalty interest under 85,414 acres (346 km2) and 1/16 non-participating royalty interest under 386,988 acres (1,566 km2).

See also

Texas and Pacific Railroad Depot (Bunkie, Louisiana)
Texas and Pacific Railroad Depot (Marshall, Texas) and Texas and Pacific Railway Museum
T&P Station in Fort Worth, Texas
Texas and Pacific 610 steam locomotive engine
Texas and Pacific (song)
Silver Slipper rubber-tired two-car train
Amtrak's Texas Eagle

References

Further reading

External links

The Texas and Pacific Railway Railfans Depot
Preserving the Texas and Pacific Railway
Texas & Pacific Railway Museum
Yahoo! Finance: The Texas Pacific Land Trust
Texas and Pacific Railway, historic photos by Robert Yarnall Richie

 
Defunct Arkansas railroads
Defunct Louisiana railroads
Defunct Oklahoma railroads
Defunct Texas railroads
Former Class I railroads in the United States
Railway companies established in 1872
Railway companies disestablished in 1976
Defunct Kansas railroads
History of San Diego
Standard gauge railways in the United States